Andrew Anderson and Fritz Wolmarans were the defending champions, but decided not to participate.

David Martin and Bobby Reynolds won the title, defeating Sam Querrey and Chris Wettengel 6–4, 6–2 in the final.

Seeds

Draw

Draw

References
 Main Draw
 Qualifying Draw

USTA Challenger of Oklahoma - Doubles
USTA Challenger of Oklahoma